Bai Baihe (born 1 March 1984) is a Chinese actress. She was among the highest paid film actresses in China.  She is best known for her roles in such films as Love is Not Blind, Personal Tailor, Monster Hunt and Go Away Mr. Tumor.

Early life
Bai was born in Qingdao, Shandong. She attended the Wendeng Road Elementary School. At a young age, Bai shown talents in singing, dancing and acting. At the age of 12, she was admitted into the Beijing Dance Academy. In 2000, Bai auditioned for a role in Zhang Yimou's film Happy Times. Even though she was not selected, Zhang saw potential in her and recommended her to apply for the Central Academy of Drama; which Bai eventually got admitted to in 2002.

Career
Shortly after her graduation from the Central Academy of Drama, Bai Baihe made her acting debut in the television series Bloom of Youth (2006). She continued to appear in dramas such as Where is Happiness (2007) and My Youthfulness (2009).

Bai achieved breakthrough with the 2011 romantic-comedy Love Is Not Blind, also starring Wen Zhang.  The low-budget film became a surprise hit at the Chinese box office. Bai won the Best Actress award at the Hundred Flowers Award. The following year, she starred in spy drama Fu Chen and was nominated at the Shanghai Television Festival for Best Actress.

Bai then starred in Feng Xiaogang's comedy film Personal Tailor (2013), which broke box office records on its opening day. The same year, Bai starred in romantic comedy A Wedding Invitation alongside Eddie Peng. The film was a commercial success and critics praise Bai for "keeping a character that could easily slip into shrill and childish far from that quagmire". Bai followed up with romantic drama film The Stolen Years, where she received rave reviews and was coined "mainland Chinese romance-drama royalty".

Bai solidified her status as China's Box Office Queen with the 2015 fantasy-comedy film Monster Hunt, directed by Raman Hui. The film grossed over 1.8 billion yuan to become the second highest grossing film in China. She then starred in romantic comedy film Go Away Mr. Tumor, which was selected as the Chinese entry for the Best Foreign Language Film at the 88th Academy Awards Bai won the Best Actress award at the China Film Director's Guild Awards, Beijing Student Film Festival and Huabiao Awards for her performance as a cartoonist who battles against cancer with an optimistic mind.

Bai topped the list of "Highest Grossing Actresses in China" for 2015, after having ranked 2nd in 2013. Variety describes her as the "pretty girl next door with decent acting chops and good comic timing".

In 2016, Bai starred alongside Chen Kun in crime caper film Chongqing Hot Pot. The film received acclaim and positive word-of-mouth, grossing 152 million yuan in four days. She then featured in romance film I Belonged to You, which broke box office sales record for mainland-produced romance films.

In 2017, Bai starred in action cop thriller The Missing, directed by Xu Jinglei.  The same year, she filmed two television productions - medical drama Surgeons and the romance series Only Side by Side with You.

In 2018, Bai reprised her role in the sequel of Monster Hunt. The film set the record for the highest box office day for a single market.
The same year, she starred in First Night Nerves, a women-centric film directed by Stanley Kwan.

In 2019, Bai starred in the drama film A City Called Macau, adapted from Geling Yan's novel of the same name and directed by Li Shaohong. Bai was nominated for the Best Actress award at the Golden Rooster Awards for her performance. The same year, she starred in the drama film Begin, Again.

She is set to star in the romance comedy film A Boyfriend for My Girlfriend alongside Wu Xiubo.

Personal life
Bai Baihe was married to actor/singer Chen Yufan on December 26, 2006. They first met while appearing in a Chinese romantic comedy television series Bloom of Youth in 2004. Their son, Chen Shengtong, was born on January 19, 2008. 

On April 16, 2017, Bai Baihe announced that they divorced at the end of 2015.

Filmography

Film

Television series

Discography

Awards and nomination

References

External links
 

Living people
1984 births
Chinese film actresses
Chinese television actresses
Central Academy of Drama alumni
Actresses from Qingdao
21st-century Chinese actresses